The 1986 All-Ireland Minor Football Championship was the 55th staging of the All-Ireland Minor Football Championship, the Gaelic Athletic Association's premier inter-county Gaelic football tournament for boys under the age of 18.

Mayo entered the championship as defending champions, however, they were defeated by Galway in the Connacht final.

On 21 September 1986, Galway won the championship following a 3–8 to 2–7 defeat of Cork in the All-Ireland final. This was their fifth All-Ireland title overall and their first in ten championship seasons.

Results

Connacht Minor Football Championship

Quarter-Final

Semi-Finals
	

Final

Leinster Minor Football Championship

Preliminary Round

Quarter-Finals

Semi-Finals

Final

Munster Minor Football Championship

Quarter-Finals

Semi-Finals

Final

Ulster Minor Football Championship

Quarter-Finals

Semi-Finals

Final

All-Ireland Minor Football Championship

Semi-Finals

Final

References

1986
All-Ireland Minor Football Championship